Luisa Revilla (12 October 1971 – 15 April 2021) was a Peruvian politician and LGBT activist. A member of the Movimiento Regional para el Desarrollo con Seguridad y Honradez (MDSH) party, she served as Provincial Mayor of Trujillo from 2015 to 2018.

Biography
Born in Trujillo, Revilla ran for the Provincial Council of the municipality, becoming the first openly transgender person to become a councilor in Peru. She held this position until 2018.

During the 2017 Peru Census, Revilla's gender identity was respected and she was registered as a woman. That same year, on International Women's Day, Mayor of Trujillo Elidio Espinoza presented her with a medal from the Provincial Municipality of Trujillo to award her for her activism in the transgender community.

Luisa Revilla died of COVID-19 on 15 April 2021, at the age of 49.

References

1971 births
2021 deaths
Peruvian politicians
Peruvian LGBT people
People from Trujillo, Peru
Deaths from the COVID-19 pandemic in Peru
Transgender women
Transgender politicians
LGBT mayors